"Lucky, Lucky Me" is a song recorded by singer Marvin Gaye and produced by Ivy Jo Hunter. Gaye originally recorded the song in 1964, but the song was shelved by Motown staff. When Motown's UK department, Tamla-Motown, issued The Very Best of Marvin Gaye, the label included the song as the final song in the track listing. Following, positive buzz from Marvin's fans in England, Tamla-Motown released the song as a single in the UK where it reached number sixty-seven on the UK Singles Chart in 1994 giving Gaye his fourth posthumous hit, a decade after his death.

Track listing
"Lucky, Lucky Me" (Extended Mix) - 5:45
"Lucky, Lucky Me" (Instrumental) - 5:02
"Lucky, Lucky Me" (Radio Edit) - 3:20
"Lucky, Lucky Me" (The '65 Ragga Vibe Mix) - 5:36
"Lucky, Lucky Me" (Jazz Mix) - 3:05
"Lucky, Lucky Me" (Ragga Vibe-No Rap) - 5:00

Credits
Lead vocal by Marvin Gaye
Background vocals by The Andantes
Instrumentation by The Funk Brothers and the Detroit Symphony Orchestra

1964 songs
1994 singles
Marvin Gaye songs
Songs written by Smokey Robinson
Songs written by Sylvia Moy
Songs written by Henry Cosby
Songs written by Ivy Jo Hunter
Song recordings produced by Ivy Jo Hunter
Songs written by William "Mickey" Stevenson